Michael Charles Gooding (born 12 April 1959) is a former professional footballer and football manager.

In the twilight of a successful playing career, Gooding was appointed joint player-manager of Reading with Jimmy Quinn when manager Mark McGhee acrimoniously left to take the reins at Leicester City. Under their guidance, Reading finished second in the First Division but was left to battle for a place in the Premier League through the playoffs, as the Premier League was being reduced in size from 22 teams to 20. Reading were beaten 4-3 by Bolton Wanderers in the playoff final at Wembley.

Gooding and Quinn remained in charge at Elm Park for two seasons afterward, until they were replaced by Terry Bullivant after failing to mount any further promotion challenges.

After Reading, Gooding had a short spell at Southend United, before retiring from football. He remained at Roots Hall for a while as a coach.

He has since carved himself a career as a radio commentary pundit, performing such roles as co-commentator for BBC Radio Berkshire's coverage of Reading's league matches, while also working as an estate agent in Tadley.

Despite playing 701 league games in a career stretching 20 years, Gooding never played top-division football – the closest he came to reaching the top flight was with Reading when they narrowly missed out on promotion to the Premier League in 1995.

References

External links

Profile at UpThePosh! The Peterborough United Database

Living people
1959 births
English footballers
Association football midfielders
Bishop Auckland F.C. players
Reading F.C. players
Rotherham United F.C. players
Chesterfield F.C. players
Peterborough United F.C. players
Wolverhampton Wanderers F.C. players
Southend United F.C. players
English Football League players
English football managers
Reading F.C. managers
Footballers from Newcastle upon Tyne